Martinello is an Italian surname. Notable people with the surname include:

Marty Martinello (born 1931), Canadian football player
Medo Martinello (born 1935), Canadian lacrosse player and coach
Silvio Martinello (born 1963), Italian cyclist

Italian-language surnames